Caroline Léonardelli (born March 10, 1965) is a French-Canadian concert harpist. Born in France, she graduated from the Conservatoire de Paris (Paris Conservatory) at age of 18 and came to Canada to study at McGill University where she completed an Artist Diploma. Based in Canada's National Capital Region, she performs for CBC national broadcasts and for Radio Canada. Her recordings are featured by Apple Music in the top ten playlist of master harp recordings and her recording label is distributed worldwide by NAXOS. She is the Principal Harpist with the Ottawa Symphony and Orchestre symphonique de Gatineau.

Life and career

Training and education
Leonardelli was born in Navarrenx, France began to study the classical harp in France at the age of seven at the Conservatoire de Pau in southwestern France. She also studied with Lily Laskine during this time.  At 14, she was invited to study at the Conservatoire de Paris (Paris Conservatory) in the class of Jacqueline Borot where she graduated with first prize in harp at age of 18.  She continued her studies with Judy Loman at the Schulich School of Music at McGill University where she completed an Artist Diploma.

Broadcasts and recordings
Leonardelli is a classical harpist who performs for CBC national broadcasts and for Radio Canada. Her recordings include: Panache with mezzo-soprano Julie Nesrallah, Impressionism by the Para Arpa harp duo, A Conte de Noel, Musique de salons en Bretagne for Radio Canada, and Ceremony of Carols by Benjamin Britten, with the Ottawa Board of Education Central Choirs under the direction of Barbara Clark.  Leonardelli's solo recording El Dorado received a Juno nomination for Classical Album of the Year - Solo or Chamber Ensemble.  The recording featured compositions by Canadian composer Marjan Mozetich.

Leonardelli's solo recording Impressions de France is featured by Apple Music in the top ten playlist of master harp recordings. Her artist-owned recording label is distributed worldwide by NAXOS. She has been described as a "World Class Harpist" in Harp Column Magazine, and her live performances have been reviewed as "Brilliant" and "Outstanding".   A review of her Impressions de France recording: stated that "What she brings or adds to the music at hand, to any piece she plays, is close to magical" and "[s]he sees beyond the notes and recreates what the composer had in mind"

Chamber music
She is a member of several chamber ensembles including a harp quartet with harpists Jennifer Swartz, Lori Gems and Caroline Lizotte, Para Arpa harp duo with Caroline Lizotte, and a harp/vocal duo with mezzo-soprano Julie Nesrallah. Caroline has performed in ensembles at numerous chamber festivals.

Choral work
Choral work is a passion for Leonardelli, who has performed a wide range of repertoire with numerous choral ensembles.  The 2005 Evergreen Wishes CBC produced concert of the Ottawa Children's Choir and Leonardelli performing John Rutter's Dancing Day received a Gabriel Award.

Orchestral roles
Leonardelli is the Principal Harpist with the Ottawa Symphony and Orchestre symphonique de Gatineau. She has also performed with the Montreal Symphony, the Quebec Symphony, the Kitchener-Waterloo Symphony, the Orchestra London Canada, Symphony Nova Scotia, and the Opera Lyra in Ottawa.

Teaching
Leonardelli teaches at her private studio of harp students, including her Lyra Angelica harp ensembles.  Leonardelli was head of the harp ensemble program at the Ottawa Youth Orchestra for 20 years.

Discography
 Serenata - Italian Solo Harp -  solo harp 
 Un Sospiro - Italian Art Songs - Leonardelli, Julie Nesrallah
 Noel Nouvelet - Leonardelli, Julie Nesrallah and keyboardist Matthew Larkin
 Impressions de France - solo harp
 Legendes - harp and organ - Leonardelli, harp and Matthew Larkin, organ
 El Dorado - solo harp with double bassist Joel Quarrington and the Penderecki String Quartet - nominated Juno Award for Classical Album of the Year - Solo or Chamber Ensemble
 Panache - Voice and harp (with Julie Nesrallah, mezzo-soprano)
 A Christmas Story (with Ottawa Bach Choir, directed by Dr. Lisette Canton)
 Impressionisme Para Arpa Harp duo Leonardelli & Caroline Lizotte

Notes and references

External links
 Harp Music Ottawa web site
 Caroline Leonardelli web site
 Facebook Musician site

Living people
Canadian harpists
Canadian classical musicians
1965 births
Women harpists
20th-century classical musicians
20th-century Canadian women musicians
21st-century classical musicians
21st-century Canadian women musicians
People from Béarn
Conservatoire de Paris alumni
McGill University School of Music alumni
French emigrants to Canada